The Wolfeboro Railroad or Wolfeborough Railroad (later the Wolfeboro Branch of the Boston and Maine Railroad) is a former short line that provided service to the summer resort town of Wolfeboro, New Hampshire (formerly spelled "Wolfeborough") on Lake Winnipesaukee.

History

Construction
Wolfeborough Railroad Company was founded on July 1, 1868, and it built a  standard gauge short line from the Portsmouth, Great Falls and Conway Railroad's tracks in Sanbornville, New Hampshire (formerly known as Wolfeborough Junction) to Wolfeboro.

Construction on the line began in November 1871, and the line was open for traffic on August 19, 1872. On January 6, 1872, the Eastern Railroad leased the Wolfeboro Railroad for a period of 68 years.

B&M era

In 1884, the Boston & Maine took over operations on the Eastern, including the Wolfeboro Railroad. The tracks in Wolfeboro were extended across Main Street to a dock on the shore of Lake Winnipesaukee for easy connections to lake steamboats, with a waiting room on the first floor of a factory. On Christmas Eve, 1899, the building burned down, and in 1900, the B&M built a new Lake Station.

On June 30, 1892, the Wolfeboro Railroad was acquired by the Boston & Maine as part of its purchase of the Eastern Railroad, and it continued operating the line as the Wolfeboro Branch. Also in 1892, the first post office for Wolfeboro Falls opened in the B&M station there. By 1903, the B&M had headquartered its Eastern Division in Sanbornville, running a large maintenance facility there. On April 8, 1911, the Sanbornville shops were destroyed in a fire. The B&M did not rebuild the facilities, sending trains instead to Dover for repairs.

Decline
In 1927, the B&M began using railcars on the line. In 1935, the lakefront station was closed, and on May 16, 1936, the B&M stopped running trains for passengers only, although it continued running mixed passenger and freight trains until about 1950. By the 1960s, only freight trains were running on the track.

Once freight service became unprofitable, the B&M decided to close the line. However, throughout the 1970s and 1980s, several companies maintained the line as a heritage railway. On December 19, 1972, a new company called the Wolfeboro Rail Road Company (WRR) was founded and took over the line, running both freight trains and a tourist steam train and reopening the lakeshore station. On January 28, 1976, the WRR also began operation on a section of railroad owned by the State of NH, under an operating contract, on the opposite side of the lake, between Concord and Lincoln. However, in November 1977, facing financial trouble, the WRR's contract was awarded to the New England Southern Railroad, and heritage service stopped after the 1978 summer season.

In 1979, the Wolfeboro Steam Railroad Corporation bought the Wolfeboro line, running tourist trains from 1980 until 1985. In 1985, the line was purchased by the State of New Hampshire, which uses the right-of-way as the Wolfeboro Recreational Rail Trail, now known as the Cotton Valley Rail Trail. The rails are intact, and they are actively used by rail clubs. The rail corridor is maintained by members of the Cotton Valley Rail Trail Club. In 1987, Wolfeboro Station was struck by lightning and caught fire, and it was repaired by the town.

References 

 Robert M. Lindsell: The Rail Lines of Northern New England. Branch Line Press, Pepperell, MA (2000), .
 Wolfeboro Railroad forum, on Winnipesaukee.com.
 R.C. Libby: Rails To Wolfeborough: A Condensed History of the Wolfeborough Rail Road Wolfeboro Rail Road (1984).

External links 
 Cotton Valley Rail Trail Club

Railway companies established in 1868
Predecessors of the Boston and Maine Railroad
Defunct New Hampshire railroads